Zir Kal (also Romanized as Zīr Kal; also known as Zīr Chāl) is a village in Tayebi-ye Sarhadi-ye Sharqi Rural District, Charusa District, Kohgiluyeh County, Kohgiluyeh and Boyer-Ahmad Province, Iran. At the 2006 census, its population was 217, in 40 families.

References 

Populated places in Kohgiluyeh County